Bettina Vollath (born 29 October 1962) is an Austrian politician of the Social Democratic Party (SPÖ) who served as a Member of the European Parliament from 2019 until 2022.

Political career
In parliament, Vollath served on the Committee on Civil Liberties, Justice and Home Affairs. In 2021, she also joined the parliament's working group on Frontex, led by Roberta Metsola. 

In addition to her committee assignments, Vollath was part of the parliament's delegation to the EU-Albania Stabilisation and Association Parliamentary Committee.

References

1962 births
Living people
Politicians from Graz
MEPs for Austria 2019–2024
Social Democratic Party of Austria MEPs
Social Democratic Party of Austria politicians
21st-century women MEPs for Austria

21st-century Austrian politicians
21st-century Austrian women politicians